Bø Church is a parish church of the Church of Norway in Midt-Telemark Municipality in Vestfold og Telemark county, Norway. It is located in the village of Bø. It is the main church for the Bø parish which is part of the Øvre Telemark prosti (deanery) in the Diocese of Agder og Telemark. The white, wooden church was built in a long church design in 1875 using plans drawn up by the architect Jacob Wilhelm Nordan. The church seats about 450 people.

History
The Old Bø Church was used for centuries by the people of Bø. By the mid-1800s, the old church was in seriously bad shape. There were structural problems that were threatening the building, in addition to the fact that the old church was much smaller than it should be for the size of the parish. It was then decided to built a new church to replace the old building. The new church was built in 1874-1875 and it was consecrated in 1875. After this, the Old Bø Church was closed and no longer used (later the old church was restored and preserved for history).

Media gallery

See also
List of churches in Agder og Telemark

References

Midt-Telemark
Churches in Vestfold og Telemark
Long churches in Norway
Wooden churches in Norway
19th-century Church of Norway church buildings
Churches completed in 1875
1875 establishments in Norway